Ilona Kolonits (17 March 1922 in Budapest – 2 August 2002 in Budapest) was a Hungarian documentary film director and international news correspondent. She was an early war correspondent and also was among the first women to be film directors. Kolonits' films were known for their lyrical treatment of historical events and the lives of ordinary people. Kolonits received numerous awards, and nominations throughout her career, including international film festivals in Paris, Moscow, Oberhausen, Cortina d’Ampezzo, Berlin, Leipzig, Mexico City and Budapest. Kolonits has been awarded the title Righteous Among the Nations and the 'Pro Virtue' Award for Courage of the Republic of Hungary for saving the lives of many during the Second World War.

Biography

Kolonits was born in 1922 in Budapest to a family of notable humanitarian political activists. Her father Ferenc Kolonits and mother Paulina Kolonits (née Holka) took an active part in the Hungarian anti-fascist resistance movement in the Second World War. Ilona volunteered to rescue over 40 children from the Budapest Ghetto who were destined to be deported and killed in the Nazi's concentration camps. In 2007, alongside her mother and her two sisters, Margit and Paola Kolonits, she was awarded the Righteous Among the Nations title by Yad Vashem in recognition of saving the lives of numerous people during the Second World War. The Kolonits family sheltered in their country home and fashion boutique in Budapest a great number of Jewish people and anti-fascists persecuted by the Nazis this way saving them from being killed by the fascists in Hungary or in death camps. Ilona's elder sister, Margit rescued children of Jewish prisoners while they were being deported. Among others, the Kolonits family rescued and adopted an orphan of the Holocaust, Erzsebet Garai, the later well known film theoretician and editor of a renowned Film theory periodical, Filmkultura. In 1944, Ilona's father Ferenc was deported to the Buchenwald concentration camp for his anti-fascist activities along with other leading members of the Hungarian Social Democratic Party. He took an active role in organising the Buchenwald Resistance movement and fought to liberate the prisoners from the camp.

Ilona also took part in carrying messages during the Nazi occupation between groups taking part in resistance in various parts of Budapest. During the Siege of Budapest she was cut off from her family, on the other side of the city over the Danube river and was stranded in a cellar for several weeks without food and very little water. She wrote a farewell note to her family but was saved when the Nazis were driven out of Budapest by the advancing 2nd and 3rd Ukrainian Front of the Soviet Army. Having witnessed the brutal fascist persecutions, numerous atrocities from the Nazis against minorities, and the street fights in Budapest during the Second World War made a lasting impression on Ilona and formed her lifelong commitment to international peace and humanitarian affairs.

As a child Ilona was interested in drama, acting and athletic sports. After the Second World War she studied at the Academy of Drama and Film in Budapest and subsequently went on to study film directing. She wrote her thesis in Documentary Cinema, and in 1954 became a Fellow of the Hungarian Academy of Sciences, one of the first women to do so, alongside Dr. Elizabeth Garai and Yvette Biro. In the anti-fascist movement, she befriended many young Hungarian writers, artists and poets including the poet Attila József, and later she became a member of the Fészek Art Club in Budapest.

Career

Between 1951 and 1989 Kolonits was a film director at the Mafilm Film Studios in Budapest and later at the Hungarian Documentary Film Studios. While other Hungarian filmmakers of her generation including Márta Mészáros and Ilona Katkics produced feature films, Kolonits remained faithful to her calling as a documentary filmmaker.

Kolonits was a dedicated documentary film director and international news and war correspondent. She shot over 500 newsreels and directed over one hundred documentaries, popular science and sport films, of which 17 received international and six Hungarian film awards. Kolonits risked her life in order to provide news from remote and conflict ridden parts of the world. She filmed armed conflicts in the Middle East and Far East in the 1960s and 1970s, accepting assignments turned down by her colleagues because of the dangers involved. Kolonits' poetic and expressive documentary cinema aimed to promote world peace, justice, equality and humanitarian causes. Kolonits often portrayed minority groups in her films, and she was in particular concerned with the cause of women and children whose lives were distraught by violent conflicts. One of her cinematic achievements is the short film Eroica (1975), which depicts the tragedy of the Vietnam War on the lives of women and children in a series of  images edited to the sounds of Symphony No. 3 in E flat major (Op. 55) by Ludwig van Beethoven (known as the Eroica, Italian for "heroic") played by the Vietnam National Symphony Orchestra. Eroica advocates peace over war by expressing simultaneously the great sorrow of loss and the overwhelming joy of rebirth in peace lived by a whole nation.

Kolonits' best known and most disputed film is As It Happened (1957), a documentary portraying the events of the 1956 Uprising in Hungary. The film was edited from original footages which Kolonits herself shot on the streets of Budapest as none of the Hungarian film directors nor camera crews were prepared to work under the conditions of violent conflict. By risking her life while filming alone on the streets during the fights, Kolonits provided authentic documentary footages of the armed conflict.  The political controversy surrounding this film related to the interpretation of the events through editing in years to come overshadowed the international cinematic heritage of Kolonits' humanist documentary cinema.

Kolonits' cinematic style has been characterised as lyrical and poetic. In her films she depicted the beauty and heroism in the everyday lives of people. Her kindness and compassion won hearts both in her home country and worldwide allowing Kolonits to portray intimate moments of joy and grief, traditions and customs of minority and ethnic communities, women and children. In 1955 she started a several-decades-long series of documentary films entitled Birthday following the lives of a group of women throughout their annual school reunions, this way presenting a very personal, feminine view of a generation. Among Kolonits' cinematic subjects were Fine Art. 'Thank You For The Clay' (Köszöntöm az agyagot) (1976) is a homage to the art and skill of the renewed Hungarian sculptor, Margit Kovacs. Kolonis' 1988 film You Like Horses, Don't You? addresses animal rights. Kolonits gave a lyrical homage to the city where she was born and which she loved in her film Budapest. The films of Kolonits are filed at the Hungarian National Digital Film Archives and Film Institute and are protected by the Hungarian Society for the Protection of Audio-Visual Authors' and Producers' Rights.

Personal life

Kolonits was considered by those few who knew her well to be a kind, courageous, noble yet lighthearted person. She never gave interviews, enjoying a private and modest life with her parents in a green suburb of Budapest. Kolonits spent her free time between her parents, siblings and extended family with whom she shared her love of reading and nature walks. She collected in her home a considerable library and art collection, while often giving large amounts anonymously to charity in support of children orphaned due to violent conflicts and war.

The only known romantic interest Kolonits had was a platonic fascination with the  Hungarian poet Attila József. Their age difference, József's engagement, and eventual early death made any relationship between them impossible. Kolonits was inspired by the his artistic talent, patriotic feelings and pacifist activities. József's speeches at the meetings of the young anti-fascists, condemning social injustice, the death penalty and supporting the cause of the oppressed minorities had a profound influence on her during her youth, and Kolonits lived by these humanitarian values throughout her life.

Kolonits died in Budapest in 2002 at the age of 80. Her ashes are resting alongside those of her parents in the historical pantheon of the Farkasréti Cemetery in Budapest. Her last wish was for József's poem, At The Danube (1936), expressing a hope for peace and for national and international reconciliation, to be read at her memorial service.

Selected awards
1963 - The Béla Balázs Award, Hungarian State Award for the Arts
1965 - The 'SZOT' Hungarian State Award
1973 - Distinguished Artist, Hungarian State Award
1979 - Award of The International Olympic Committee
1980 - Outstanding Artist, Hungarian State Award
2007 - 'Righteous Among the Nations', awarded by the Commission for Designation of the Righteous of the Holocaust Martyrs' and Heroes' Remembrance Authority (Yom HaShoah), Jerusalem, Israel
 Film and Cinematic Festival awards won by Kolonits included Paris, Moscow, Oberhausen, Cortina d’Ampezzo, Mexico City, Budapest and Miskolc .

Selected filmography

 Flowering Life Replacing The Ruins (Romok helyen viragzo elet) 1949
 They Need Peace (Nekik béke kell), 1952 - Winner of the 1954 Children's Film Festival, Paris, France
 Matyasföld, (Matyásföld), 1953
 Before the Decision (Választas elött...) 1953
 Budapest, 1953
 In the Land of 'Matyo', 1953
 Budapest Industrial Expo (Budapesti Helyipari Vásár), 1955
 A Journey In Szabolcs (Utazás Szabolcsban), 1955
 Birthday (Születésnap), 1955	
 On The Embankment Of The Sajo River (Sajoparti Történet), 1955	
 Six Boys, Six Buses (Hat fiu, hat busz),	1956
 Change of Programme (Müsorváltozás), 1957	
 Ez It Happened (Így törtent), 1957
 Talking Fruits (Beszélö gyümölcsök), 1957	
 Nowhere Else Apart From Here (A nagyvilágon e kivul), 1957
 May I?  (Szabad?), 1958
 We Will Meet In Vienna (Bécsben találkozunk), 1959
 The Last Curtain (Az utolso felvonás), 1959
 Bridges, Embankments, People, (Hidak, partok emberek)1960
 History Lesson For Boys (Törtenelmi lecke fiuknak), 1960
 April Greetings (Áprilisi köszöntö),1960	
 In the Footsteps Of Childhood (Gyermekévek nyomában) 1961
 Two Harvests in Markaz (Két szuret Markazon) 1961
 Off To Baghdad (Irány Bagdad), 1961
 Festival In Helsinki (Fesztival Helszinkiben) 1962
 Minutes Observed (Ellesett percek) 1962 - Winner of the 3rd Hungarian Short Film Biennale, Budapest
 The 'Puszta' in Winter (A Puszta télen) 1963
 The Last Stop (Végállomas) 1964
 Thoughts About A Street's Name (Gondolatok egy utca névhez) 1964
 Seasons, Masters, Artworks (Evszakok, mesterek, muvek) 1964
 Five Times a Week (Hetenkent ötször) 1965 - 1st Prize of Silver Javelin OTSH Film Festival, Budapest, 1965 ,1st Prize of the Italian Film Production Companies, Cortina d'Ampezzo, 1966,  CIDALC Award, Grenoble, 1968
 Chanson (Sanzon) 1966
 Red Signs On The Path of War (Vörös jelek a hadak utján) 1966 - Russian Historical State Award
 This Is As Well Budapest (Ez is Budapest) 1967
 Ode (Oda) 1967
 To My Soldier Son (Katonafiamnak) 1968 - 1st prize of the Veszprem Army Film Festival, Hungary
 Madonnas (Madonnak) 1968
 …And There Will Be A Millions Of Us (Es million leszunk) 1968
 5 x 1 (5x1), 1969 - Winner of OTSH Film Art Festival, Silver Javelin Prize, 1970, Budapest, Hungary
 The Train (A Vonat), 1970
 Variations On a Theme (Valtozatok egy temara), 1970
 On The Conveyer-belt of History (A tortenelem futoszallagan), 1970
 Self-portrait (Onarckep), 1971
 Two Cities, One Day (Ket varos, egy nap), 1972
 With Abandon, (Onfeledten), 1972
 Two Towns, (Két város), 1972
 Red Gold  (Piros Arany), 1973
 My World (Az en vilagom), 1973
 Sparkles (Csillagszorok), 1973
 Those Who Are Waited For (Akiket varnak), 1973
 A Week On A Mountain (Egy hét egy hegyen), 1973
 Sport, Rhythm, Music (Sport, ritmus, zene), 1974
 Together Again (Ismet egyutt), 1974
 Eroica, 1975 - Golden Prize of the Moscow Film Festival 1975, Distinction at the Tampere Film festival, Finland 1976
 Meeting In Peace (Talakozás békében), 1975
 White Acacia (Fehér akác), 1976
 Let Them Have Reverence (Adassék neki tisztelet), 1976
 Thank You For The Clay (Köszönöm az anyagot), 1976
 Good Morning Siberia! (Jo reggelt Sziberia!) - The Prize of the City of Leipzig, Germany
 In Several Voices (Több szolamban), 1977
 The Continuation of A Film (Egy film folytatása), 1978
 Nursery Olympics (Óvis Olympia), 1979 - Award of the International Youth Committee, 1980, Award of the International Olympic Committee 1980, Award of the Russian Olympic Committee, 1980, Silver Javelin Prize, 1980, Budapest, Hungary
 The Survivals (A tulélök), 1980 
 Thank You, We Are Well… (Koszonjuk, jol vagyunk...), 1981 
 Greeting Life (Eletköszöntö), 1982 
 House of Lace ( A csipkeház), 1982
 Painting With Background (Festmény háttérrel), 1983
 A Nuclear Power Station (Atomeromu), 1983
 Goose Empire (Libabirodalom), 1983
 The Daughters of Laos (Laosz lányai), 1984
 The Fourth Meeting (Negyedik találkozás), 1985
 The City Of The Golden Budda (Az arany Buddha városa), 1985
 The Fourth Meeting (A negyedik talákozás), 1985
 You Do Love Horses, Don't You? (A lovakat szeretik, ugye?), 1988 - Award of Montecatini, Special Prize of the Festival Of Tourism, Special Prize at the Hungarian Sport Film Festival, Budapest

References

Notes
 Kolonits, Margit, 'My Memoirs' ('Visszaemlékezéseim' ) (10 August 1976, Budapest)
 Csőke, József, 'Kolonits Ilona (1922–2002)', Krónika,  Filmvilág folyóirat 3 September 2002 old.
 Elena Kaplinskaya 'Illuzion', Profizdat 1991 
 Lóránt, Stőhr, 'Nothing is Set in Stone - Conversation with Éva Kármentő' (Semmi sincs kőbe vésve - Beszélgetés Kármentő Évával)

Bibliography
 The British Film Institute, Archives, http://explore.bfi.org.uk/4ce2ba034a8bb 
 Csőke, József, 'Kolonits Ilona (1922–2002)', Krónika,  Filmvilág folyóirat 3 September 2002 old.
 Dr. Garai, Erzsébet,  'My Memoirs' ('Visszaemlékezéseim' ) (2003, Budapest),
 Kolonits, Margit (Vámos Ferencné), 'My Memoirs' ('Visszaemlékezéseim' ) (10 August 1976, Budapest), manuscript, in private collection, Budapest
 Kaplinskaya, Elena 'TIlluzion', Profizdat 1991 pp. 124–140
 'Ilona Kolonits Passed Away' (Elhunyt Kolonits Ilona) (11 July 2002, MTI, (www.filmkultura.hu)
 Lóránt, Stőhr, 'Nothing is Set in Stone - Conversation with Éva Kármentő' (Semmi sincs kőbe vésve - Beszélgetés Kármentő Évával)
 Yad Vashem, Archives http://db.yadvashem.org/righteous/righteousName.html?language=en&itemId=6831285
 (https://web.archive.org/web/20070714164907/http://www.filmkultura.hu/2003/articles/profiles/karmentoe.hu.html#top)
 :hu:Kolonits Ilona#Filmjei
 http://mandarchiv.hu/film/
 Ilona Kolonits ""Thank You For The Clay"" (Köszöntöm az agyagot) (fragment) http://mandarchiv.hu/video/3817/Koszontom_az_agyagot_reszlet
 http://www.filmintezet.hu
 IMDb, https://www.imdb.com/name/nm3761630/

1922 births
2002 deaths
Hungarian film directors
Hungarian women film directors
Hungarian Righteous Among the Nations
Women in World War II
Hungarian resistance members
Women television journalists
Hungarian resistance movement of World War II
Artists of Merit of the Hungarian People's Republic
Women war correspondents
Burials at Farkasréti Cemetery
Female anti-fascists